Francisco de Mello e Castro was the 17th Governor of Portuguese Ceylon. He was appointed in 1653 under Philip III of Portugal, and was Governor until 1655. He was succeeded by António de Sousa Coutinho.

References

Governors of Portuguese Ceylon
16th-century Portuguese people
1600 births
Year of death unknown
17th-century Portuguese people
1664 deaths